I Have Something to Tell You is a 2020 memoir by Chasten Buttigieg. It was published by Atria Books in September 2020 and includes topics from his early life in a conservative Midwestern family including sexual assault, domestic violence, and growing up closeted. Buttigieg also details his experiences during his husband's 2020 presidential campaign.

Content
The autobiography describes Buttigieg's early life through his marriage to Pete Buttigieg and his role on Pete's US presidential campaign.

Reception
The hardcover edition debuted at number 12 on The New York Times Best Seller list for hardcover non-fiction.

The book received mixed reviews, with some critics feeling it did not live up to its most promising moments. For The Washington Post, Stephen Pedro wrote, “His book reveals an emotional honesty about his life story, which includes sexual assault, homelessness, estrangement from his family of origin and bullying. His candor is refreshing, and it extends the success he had in humanizing his husband on the campaign trail." He went on, "The blind spot the memoir has for Mayor Pete’s lack of support among Black and Latino voters makes the book, which in some ways is so powerful, so ultimately frustrating.”

References 

2020 non-fiction books
American memoirs
Books about politics of the United States
English-language books
LGBT autobiographies
Political memoirs
Atria Publishing Group books
2020s LGBT literature
LGBT literature in the United States